Dichomeris eucomopa is a moth in the family Gelechiidae. It was described by Edward Meyrick in 1939. It is found on Java in Indonesia.

The larvae feed on Bauhinia species.

References

Moths described in 1939
eucomopa